This is a partial list of ghost towns in Arizona in the United States. Most ghost towns in Arizona are former mining boomtowns that were abandoned when the mines closed. Those not set up as mining camps often became mills or supply points supporting nearby mining operations.

Conditions

Ghost towns can include sites in various states of disrepair and abandonment. Some sites no longer have any trace of buildings or civilization and have reverted to empty land. Other sites are unpopulated but still have standing buildings. Still others may support full-time residents, though usually far less than at their historical peak, while others may now be museums or historical sites.

For ease of reference, the sites listed here are placed into one of the following general categories.

Barren site
 Site is no longer in existence
 Site has been destroyed, covered with water, or reverted to empty land
 May have a few difficult to find foundations/footings at most

Neglected site
 Little more than rubble remains at the site
 Dilapidated, often roofless buildings remain at the site

Abandoned site
 Building or houses still standing, but all or almost all are abandoned
 No population, with the possible exception of a caretaker
 Site no longer in use, except for one or two buildings

Semi-abandoned site
 Buildings or houses still standing, but most are abandoned
 A few residents may remain

Historic site
 Buildings or houses still standing
 Site has been converted to a historical site, museum, or tourist attraction
 Still a busy community, but population is smaller than its peak years

Ghost towns

Images of ghost towns

See also
 American Old West
 Arizona Territory
 Copper mining in Arizona
 History of Arizona
 New Mexico Territory
 Silver mining in Arizona
 Tombstone, Arizona
 List of cemeteries in Arizona

References

Further reading

External links
 Ghost Town of the Month – azghosttowns.com
 GhosttownAZ
 Arizona Ghost Towns – GhostTownGallery.com
 GhostTowns.com

Arizona
Ghost towns
Ghost towns in Arizona
Ghost towns in Arizona